Jimmy McKinnell Sr. is best known for his lengthy service to Dumfries association football club, Queen of the South.

Biography

McKinnell was a member of the original board when Queen of the South F.C. were formed by the merger of local clubs in March 1919 with the intention of forming a Dumfries club to compete on a national rather than a local level. He became treasurer in 1922 and in 1938 became Secretary / Manager.

In his only full season competing as manager in the Scottish League he took them to a sixth-place finish in the top tier — bettered by the club only in 1934 and equaled only in 1956. Early in his second season, football competition was dissolved at a national level due to the outbreak of World War II.

McKinnell retired in 1946 and was succeeded by his son, Jimmy McKinnell Jr. McKinnell senior was given a testimonial in 1947. He died in 1965 at the age of 93.

References

Queen of the South F.C. managers
Scottish football managers
1965 deaths
Year of birth uncertain
Scottish Football League managers